The Alpine Association of Slovenia is the association of volunteer Alpine clubs providing the conditions for the development and exercising of mountaineering and hill walking in Slovenia and abroad. It is among the Slovenian non-governmental organisations with the highest membership and has the largest number of members of all sports organisations in Slovenia.

As of October 2015, the association included 287 branches (mountaineering/hill walking clubs, mountain rescue stations, etc.), which altogether had 53,975 (as of 2014) members of all ages. It was established in June 1948 in Ljubljana and is the successor of the Slovene Alpine Club, established in Ljubljana on 27 February 1893.

The Alpine Association of Slovenia performs its tasks under the leadership of its President and three Vice-Presidents, an expert service, and several commissions: economic commission, climbing commission, mountain sports commission, commissions for expeditions to foreign mountains, mountain trails, sport climbing, mountain biking, conservation of the mountain environment, guides' commission, youth commission, and several boards and other workforces.

The Alpine Publishing House, operating under the auspices of the Association, publishes mountain hiking maps and guides, professional and belletristic literature, and, since 1895, the monthly mountaineering magazine Planinski Vestnik (Alpine Gazette).

References

External links 

 Official site of the Alpine Association of Slovenia

Hiking in Slovenia
Association
Volunteering in Slovenia
Non-profit organizations based in Slovenia
Sports governing bodies in Slovenia
Hiking governing bodies
Climbing organizations
Alpine clubs
1948 establishments in Slovenia